Miss Machine is the second studio album by American mathcore band The Dillinger Escape Plan released in July 2004 through Relapse Records.  It is the first album by the band to feature vocalist Greg Puciato and bassist Liam Wilson. Miss Machine marks a change to a more experimental style by the band.

The album is The Dillinger Escape Plan's first album since 1999, the gap between albums being accredited to a number of bad fortunes, and a short EP release with lead vocals being performed by Mike Patton. There were three music videos made for the album ("Panasonic Youth", "Unretrofied", and "Setting Fire to Sleeping Giants") directed by Neurosis' Josh Graham. The band decided to feature metalcore producer Steve Evetts to produce the album. Also, "Unretrofied" was featured in WWE SmackDown! vs. Raw 2006 video game.

Musical direction
Until the band's 2007 release of the further groundbreaking Ire Works, Miss Machine was considerably the band's most experimental release to date, as the band drew from the experience of working with Mike Patton and the industrial influence of bands such as Nine Inch Nails. It is also arguably their most accessible due to the band toning down the musical complexity and adding new elements like slower song tempos, singing vocals, and more straightforward song structures.

Due to Mike Patton collaborating with the band, his experimental influences began to rub off on The Dillinger Escape Plan.  In addition, Greg Puciato was involved with Error, an industrial band, around the same time as the release of Miss Machine, all of which would form their sound on Miss Machine. The album turned out to be much more experimental, and include many more jazz-fusion elements and electronics. Weinman's guitars were not as prominent in the mix, and Pennie's drumming was not as demanding.

Andrew Racher of Brooklyn Vegan said calling the album mathcore was "too niche" and "undersells it." He described the album's sound as "progressive circus acid freakout avant-goth metallic rock."

Reception

Critical reception 

The critical reception for Miss Machine was relatively favorable, with Allmusic going so far as to say, "There's nothing more to say — the next true image of rock & roll has crawled out of the swamps of Jersey." Despite being positive in their review, Pitchfork noticed "Though Miss Machine displays DEP in top musical form, the band seems to have lost its confidence and direction." Rolling Stone, however, was negative, noticing "unless you're trying to drive a third world dictator out of his barricaded palace, you'll be hard pressed to listen to Miss Machine in its entirety." Miss Machine has earned a metascore of 80 on review aggregate site Metacritic indicating favorable reviews.

Track listing

Personnel

The Dillinger Escape Plan
 Greg Puciato – vocals
 Ben Weinman – lead guitar, producer
 Brian Benoit – rhythm guitar
 Chris Pennie – drums, producer
 Liam Wilson – bass

Production
 Steve Evetts – producer, engineering, mixing
 Jesse Cannon – Pro Tools
 Tom Shumway – assistant engineer
 James Russo – assistant engineer
 Alan Douches – mastering
 Mike Watkajtys – live sound engineer
 Brian Montuori – artwork and direction
 Dimitri Minakakis – layout and design
 Matthew Jacobson – executive producer

Chart positions

References

The Dillinger Escape Plan albums
2004 albums
Relapse Records albums
Albums produced by Steve Evetts